Senator Orr may refer to:

Alexander D. Orr (1761–1835), Virginia State Senate
Arthur Orr (born 1964), Alabama State Senate
Charles N. Orr (1877–1949), Minnesota State Senate
Robert D. Orr (1917–2004), Indiana State Senate
Robert Orr Jr. (1786–1876), Pennsylvania State Senate